The 1971 Japan Series was the 22nd edition of Nippon Professional Baseball's postseason championship series. It matched the Central League champion Yomiuri Giants against the Pacific League champion Hankyu Braves. This was the fourth time in five years that the two teams had met in the Japan Series, with the Giants winning all previous matchups. The Giants defeated the Braves in five games to win their seventh consecutive title.

Summary

See also
1971 World Series

References

Japan Series
Orix Buffaloes
Yomiuri Giants
Japan Series
Japan Series
Japan Series